Robert Heyde Soleau Jr. (April 2, 1941 – June 21, 2014) was a professional American football player for the National Football League (NFL)'s Pittsburgh Steelers. He played linebacker during the 1964 season.  Soleau played college football at William & Mary and is the son of Charles R. Soleau, an All-American quarterback at Colgate in 1932.  Later in life he was a successful businessman in the insurance industry and owned Diversified Group Brokerage in Marlborough, Connecticut.

References

External links
 Bob Soleau @ TribeAthletics.com

1941 births
2014 deaths
American football linebackers
Pittsburgh Steelers players
William & Mary Tribe football players
Sportspeople from Amherst, Massachusetts
Players of American football from Massachusetts